Lake Saint Catherine is an  body of water located in Rutland County, Vermont in the towns of Wells and Poultney. Lake St. Catherine State Park is located along its eastern shore.

External links
 Historical Images of Lake St. Catherine VT and area ~ Richard Clayton Photography

References
Vermont Atlas & Gazetteer (1996). DeLorme: Yarmouth, Maine.
http://www.lakestcatherine.org/History

Saint Catherine
Poultney, Vermont
Wells, Vermont
Bodies of water of Rutland County, Vermont